In mathematics, the Hecke algebra is the algebra generated by Hecke operators.

Properties
The algebra is a commutative ring.

In the classical elliptic modular form theory,  the Hecke operators Tn with n coprime to the level acting on the space of cusp forms of a given weight are self-adjoint with respect to the Petersson inner product. Therefore, the spectral theorem implies that there is a basis of modular forms that are eigenfunctions for these Hecke operators. Each of these basic forms possesses an Euler product. More precisely, its Mellin transform is the Dirichlet series that has Euler products with the local factor for each prime p is the reciprocal of the Hecke polynomial, a quadratic polynomial in p−s. In the case treated by Mordell, the space of cusp forms of weight 12 with respect to the full modular group is one-dimensional. It follows that the Ramanujan form has an Euler product and establishes the multiplicativity of τ(n).

See also
 Abstract algebra
 Wiles's proof of Fermat's Last Theorem

References 

Jean-Pierre Serre, A course in arithmetic.

Algebra
Number theory
Modular forms